Mirosław Sznaucner (born 9 May 1979 in Będzin) is a Polish former professional footballer who played as a defender. He is currently the assistant coach for the Greek club PAOK FC.

Career

Club
His playing career began in 1996, at the age of 17, from Pogon. In 1999 he transferred to GKS Katowice, where he stayed for four years. In 2003, he joined Iraklis, where he played for the next four years. At the end of his contract, in 2007, he then joined PAOK, where he stayed until 2012, making 120 appearances for the club.
He usually plays as a side back, either on the left or the right, but can occasionally play as a center-back: a very valuable player, able to giving solutions when needed.

International
He has also played for Poland twice, but has not managed to break into first team options and was not present in the last big tournaments.

Managerial career
Miroslav Sznaucner joined PAOK in 2014 as a coach. He was then called to take over the technical leadership of PAOK's newly formed Under-16 side and continued with the Under-20s. He was then promoted to the first team before then returning to the Under-19s to work alongside Pablo García, with whom they have already celebrated three league titles.

Personal
His son Maximilian played for PAOK Academies.

Career statistics

Club

Honours

Club
PAOK
Superleague Greece: Runner-up 2009–2010

References

External links
 
 

1979 births
Living people
Polish footballers
Poland international footballers
Polish expatriate footballers
Association football defenders
PAOK FC players
Iraklis Thessaloniki F.C. players
GKS Katowice players
Ekstraklasa players
Super League Greece players
Expatriate footballers in Greece
People from Będzin
Sportspeople from Silesian Voivodeship
Veria F.C. players
PAOK FC non-playing staff
Polish people of German descent